Haft may refer to:

 Haft, another name for the hilt of a bayonet, knife, or sword
 Haft, the shaft of an arrow, axe, or spear
 The narrow constricted part of the standards (petals) and falls (sepals) near the center of the iris flower
 Haft, Iran, a village in Razavi Khorasan Province, Iran
Hafting, the process by which an arrowhead, axehead, or spearhead is set into the wood.

People with the surname
 Herbert Haft (1920-2004), American businessman and father of businessman Robert Haft (see below)
 Robert Haft (20th century), American businessman